Fire King is an action role-playing video game. It was developed by Micro Forté, published by Strategic Studies Group and distributed by Electronic Arts in 1988 for the Commodore 64/128 and MS-DOS. It was sequel to another game of the same style titled Demon Stalkers: The Raid on Doomfane. The game has been compared to Gauntlet, with its top-down view and endless enemies spawning from monster generators, but differs in that it contains more plot and puzzles than the typical hack and slash game.

Plot
The player becomes one of six characters, first appearing in a room above the town square of the town in Stormhaven Bay. The harmony of the land is controlled by the great elemental forces of Earth, Air, Fire, and Water, each controlled by a mage. The Fire Mage was king until he was slain by a magical beast of superhuman strength and size. Although this monster was slain, another magical beast appeared and began to dine on villagers. New enemies roam the countryside, leaving it to the player characters to confront the beast in the catacombs and end the terror.

Reception
The game was reviewed in 1990 in Dragon #158 by Hartley, Patricia, and Kirk Lesser in "The Role of Computers" column. The reviewers gave the game 4½ out of 5 stars. Douglas Seacat of Computer Gaming World noted, "The synthesis of action and RPG is an interesting, if not altogether successful one." Seacat praised the plot but noted the pace of the action did not match the slow-paced inventory system, commenting that, "The entire game just seems to have a rough edge, as if it weren't finished yet."

Reviews
The Games Machine - Nov, 1989

References

External links
Fire King at GameFAQs
Fire King at GameSpot

Review in Compute!'s Gazette
Review in Info

1988 video games
Commodore 64 games
Commodore 128 games
DOS games
Electronic Arts games
Role-playing video games
Strategic Studies Group games
Video game sequels
Video games developed in Australia